There Will Come a Day may refer to:

 There Will Come a Day (album), an album by Shirley Myers
 There Will Come a Day (film), a 2013 Italian drama film
 "There Will Come a Day", a song by Faith Hill from Breathe
 "There Will Come a Day (I'm Gonna Happen to You)", a song by Smokey Robinson from Deep in My Soul

See also
 "There Will Be a Day", a 2008 song by Jeremy Camp